Stricklerstown is an unincorporated community in Millcreek Township, Lebanon County, Pennsylvania, United States.

Notes

Unincorporated communities in Lebanon County, Pennsylvania
Unincorporated communities in Pennsylvania